Harry Skitt (26 June 1901 – 1976) was a professional footballer who played for Darlaston, Northfleet United, Tottenham Hotspur, and Chester.

Football career 
Skitt began his career at Darlaston before joining Spurs nursery club Northfleet United. The defender joined Tottenham in 1924 and played a total of 229 matches in all competitions for the White Hart Lane club. In 1931 Skitt moved to Chester ahead of their debut season in The Football League along with fellow Spurs players Baden Herod and Andy Thompson. He went on to make a further 101 appearances before ending his career at Congleton.

References 

1901 births
1976 deaths
Footballers from Wolverhampton
English footballers
English Football League players
Darlaston Town F.C. players
Northfleet United F.C. players
Tottenham Hotspur F.C. players
Chester City F.C. players
Association football central defenders